Panther, a battle tank-driving simulation named after the Panther tank, was one of a handful of early first-person computer games developed by John Edo Haefeli and Nelson Bridwell in 1975 at Northwestern University. The game was developed for the multi-user interactive computer-based education PLATO system and programmed in the TUTOR programming language and utilized scalable vector graphics called linesets. A 1977 development of Panther, with more refined graphics, was named Panzer, the German word for armour and tank.

Nelson contributed the original concept of a tank combat game, which was inspired by Brand Fortner's Airfight, Jim Bowery's Spasim, and an unfinished tank game effort of Derek Ward. Nelson also provided the Panther tank artwork, the vehicle motion, view, and damage equations, and a significant fraction of the original code. John was a highly capable TUTOR IV programmer who created the overall game framework, providing key features such as team selection and messaging that turned the concept into a working game, later adding a number of refinements.

Version A (1975) of Panther has recently been restored to active status on the Cyber1 CYBIS-based (a PLATO descendant) system, with direct permission of the developer.

Gameplay
The game features team-based deathmatch. There are two teams, Squares and Triangles. The object of the game is to destroy the opposing team's base. Game play is straightforward; the player selects a pseudonym and a team, traverse the terrain looking for enemies to destroy on the way to their base. Perspective is maintained by the use of scalable vector graphics and visual interest is enhanced with special graphics for explosions using a custom character set to accomplish limited raster graphics animation.

When players enter the game their tanks are placed randomly in the playing arena near their bases and are temporarily camouflaged to allow time to orient themselves with the current map and state of play. The initial view of the game is in "on-board" mode, which is a first-person perspective of the arena. The other main view available is the map which shows the 5 mountains (Crag, Nixon, Og, Pathos, and Red) which vary in size and placement each time a new game is started. On the map view players can see all of their team members positions and can see enemies only when they are within range. Messaging between team members is available and broadcast-style messages (insults) to the opposing team are also allowed. Team coordination and cooperation is critical to winning in this game as each player has different skills, some players are better at hunting down and killing enemies (or at least engaging and distracting them), others are good at hiding and sneaking to the opposing base to begin bombardment. An interesting capability of the game is that players can donate ammunition and fuel to other players in order to facilitate their role in the game. Ammunition and fuel are loaded at the player's base.

See also
Battlezone

1975 video games
Tank simulation video games
PLATO (computer system) games
Video games developed in the United States